Loau Solamalemalo Keneti Sio (born Apia, 3 April 1964) is a Samoan politician, former Cabinet Minister, and rugby union player. He is a member of the Human Rights Protection Party (HRPP).

Early life 
Loau was educated at Faleula Primary School before studying at Samoa College. He worked in a bank and as a farmer and fisherman.

Rugby career
His first cap for Samoa was against Tonga, at Apia, on 26 May 1988 and his last international cap was against Tonga, at Moamoa, on 4 June 1994. Loau represented Samoa for a total of 12 years, including at the 1991 and 1995 Rugby World Cup tournaments, though he did not take part at both tournaments.

Political career
Loau was first elected to the Legislative Assembly of Samoa as an independent at the 2006 Samoan general election. He joined the HRPP and was appointed Associate Minister of Education. In November 2009 he was charged with threatening to kill over a shooting incident in the village of Faleula; the charge was dismissed in 2010. He subsequently lost his seat in the 2011 election.

Loau was re-elected in 2016 and appointed Minister of Education, Sports and Culture. As Minister of Education he unsuccessfully attempted to reintroduce corporal punishment in schools, and opposed sex education. In July 2019, the New Zealand transgender weightlifter Laurel Hubbard was awarded two gold medals at the 2019 Pacific Games which were held in Samoa. Loau, speaking as the Samoa 2019 chairman, said that the decision to allow Hubbard to compete was "unfair" and added that "We all know that it is not fair to the women lifters but that is a reality we face in the world of sports".

Loau was re-elected in the 2021 Samoan general election. On 12 July 2021 he agreed to resign as part of the settlement of an election petition. On 20 July the agreement was rescinded, and the petition proceeded to trial. Loau successfully retained his seat.

Following the 2021 Samoan by-elections Loau publicly called for Tuila'epa and other HRPP senior leaders to step aside.

Personal life 
Loau is married to Malama Sio and they have four children. He is a member of the Congregational Christian Church and the Catholic Church in Faleula.

Notes

References

External links
Keneti Sio international stats

|-

|-

|-

1964 births
Sportspeople from Apia
Samoan rugby union players
Rugby union centres
Samoa international rugby union players
Samoan Congregationalists
Members of the Legislative Assembly of Samoa
Living people
Culture ministers of Samoa
Education ministers of Samoa
Sports ministers of Samoa
Human Rights Protection Party politicians